Luis Elian Estrada Mazorra (born ) is a Cuban male volleyball player. He is part of the Cuba men's national volleyball team. On club level he plays in Brazil for Itambe Minas.

References

External links
 profile at FIVB.org

2000 births
Living people
Cuban men's volleyball players
Place of birth missing (living people)
21st-century Cuban people